Aerzen is a municipality in the Hamelin-Pyrmont district, in Lower Saxony, Germany.

Economy 
One of the biggest employers in the region is Aerzener Maschinenfabrik GmbH., a manufacturer of blowers and compressors. As of April 2008, they had an estimated 1000 employees.

Notable people 
 Börries von Münchhausen (civil servant) (1587-1646), secret Kammerrat, mortgage holder of the Office Aerzen
 Gustav Karl Wilhelm Siemens (1806-1874), member of the National Assembly in Frankfurt
 August Heissmeyer (1897-1979), Obergruppenführer and General of the Waffen SS

References

Hameln-Pyrmont